George Schuster may refer to:

George Schuster (driver)  (1873–1972), driver of the American built Thomas Flyer and winner of the 1908 New York to Paris Auto Race
Sir George Schuster (public servant) (1881–1982), British barrister, financier, colonial administrator and Liberal politician